1-Dodecene is an alkene with the formula C10H21CH=CH2, consisting of a chain of twelve carbon atoms ending with a double bond. While there are many isomers of dodecene depending on which carbon the double bond is placed, this isomer is of greater commercial importance. It is classified as an alpha-olefin. Alpha-olefins are distinguished by having a double bond at the primary or alpha (α) position. This location of a double bond enhances the reactivity of the compound and makes it useful for a number of applications, especially for the production of detergents.

Production and reactions
1-Dodecene is commercially produced by oligomerization of ethylene via a number of processes. In the Shell Higher Olefin Process (SHOP), a nickel catalyst is employed.  In processes developed by Gulf and by Ethyl Corporations, triethylaluminium is the catalyst. Similar to the SHOP method, these processes rely on ethylene insertion into an Al-alkyl bond competitively with beta-hydride elimination to give the alpha-olefin, regenerating an aluminium hydride. Other processes have been developed.

References

Alkenes